The New Hotel Carquinez or simply Hotel Carquinez is a registered historic place in Richmond, California. It is located in the Iron Triangle at 410 Harbor Way. It is named after the Carquinez Strait. The New Hotel Carquinez was the original name and it was later changed to Hotel Don. The building currently functions as senior housing center. The hotel was the center of decision making for the city of Richmond prior to the construction of the Richmond Civic Center.

See also
National Register of Historic Places listings in Contra Costa County, California

Notes

Buildings and structures in Richmond, California
National Register of Historic Places in Richmond, California
Hotel buildings on the National Register of Historic Places in California
Hotels established in 1926
Hotel buildings completed in 1926
1926 establishments in California